Sorisole is a comune (municipality) in the Province of Bergamo in the Italian region of Lombardy, located about  northeast of Milan and about  north of Bergamo.

The municipality of Sorisole contains the frazioni (subdivisions, mainly villages and hamlets) Petosino and Azzonica.

Sorisole borders the following municipalities: Almè, Bergamo, Paladina, Ponteranica, Sedrina, Villa d'Almè, Zogno. Part of Sorisole's territory is part of Parco dei Colli di Bergamo and is crossed by river Quisa.

Demographic evolution

References